Bromus kalmii, the Arctic brome or prairie brome,  is a species of brome grass. It is a native bunchgrass in the North-central and Northeastern United States, the Great Lakes region, and eastern Canada. The specific epithet kalmii refers to its discoverer Pehr Kalm.

Description

The culms are pubescent just below the nodes. The grass typically has three to five and occasionally six leaf blades. The glabrous or sometimes shaggy sheaths are mostly shorter than the internodes and each have a "V" shaped cleft. The lower branches of the panicle are very slender and each bear one or two spikelets. Both glumes have short, adpressed hairs. The lower glume is three-nerved and the upper glume is five-nerved. The oblong and flat palea is slightly shorter than the glume.

The grass flowers from July to through August.

Habitat
Bromus kalmii grows in dry or moist open areas or thickets, especially on calcareous soils.

References

kalmii
Flora of North America
Plants described in 1848